Windhorst (also known as Windthorst) is an unincorporated community in Ford County, Kansas, United States.  It is located in a rural area southeast of Spearville and northeast of Ford.

History
A post office was opened in Windhorst in 1898, and remained in operation until it was discontinued in 1905.

The present-day community consists of a church, a school, a priest's house, and residential housing, but little more. The community is best known for the Immaculate Heart of Mary Church, which closed in 1997. It is listed in the National Register of Historic Places and can still be visited.

Education
Windhorst is a part of USD 381 Spearville Schools. The Spearville High School mascot is the Royal Lancers.

Windhorst schools were closed through school unification. The Windhorst High School mascot was Bluejays. The Windhorst Bluejays won the Kansas State High School class B Baseball championship in 1956.

References

Further reading

External links
 Windthorst Heritage
 Ford County maps: Current, Historic - KDOT

Unincorporated communities in Kansas
Unincorporated communities in Ford County, Kansas